Hurand District was in Ahar County, East Azerbaijan province, Iran. At the 2006 National Census, its population was 22,528 in 4,744 households. The following census in 2011 counted 21,089 people in 5,504 households. At the latest census in 2016, the district had 20,701 inhabitants in 6,154 households. The district was elevated to the status of a county after the census, and the city of Hurand became its capital.

References 

Ahar County

Districts of East Azerbaijan Province

Populated places in East Azerbaijan Province

Populated places in Ahar County